Scale up, scale-up, or scaleup may refer to:
Scalability, the ability to function with different amounts of required work, or to be readily adjusted to do so
Scaleup company

See also 

 Image scaling, also known as "upscaling" an image
 SCALE-UP, a type classroom layout and learning environment
 Video scaler, also known as "upscaling" a video